192 A.D. is a year.

192 may also refer to:

 192 BC
 192 (number)

Roads

 U.S. Route 192
 Connecticut Route 192
 Illinois Route 192
 Maryland Route 192
 New York State Route 192
 Pennsylvania Route 192
 Alabama State Route 192
 California State Route 192
 Georgia State Route 192
 Virginia State Route 192
 Japan National Route 192
 Arkansas Highway 192
 Iowa Highway 192
 Wyoming Highway 192

Military
 No. 192 Squadron RAF
 192d Airlift Squadron
 192d Fighter Wing
 192nd Tank Battalion
 192nd Military Police Battalion
 192nd Infantry Division (France)

Music
 192TV
 192 (album)
 192 (song)

Transportation and motorsport
 Jordan 192
 Greater Manchester bus route 192

Other uses
 192.com
 Minuscule 192
 Radical 192

See also
 19-2 (2011 TV series), French-language Canadian police crime drama television series
 19-2 (2014 TV series), adapted English-language Canadian television series